Stanley Kubrick: A Life in Pictures is a 2001 documentary about the life and work of Stanley Kubrick, famed film director, made by his long-time assistant and brother-in-law Jan Harlan.

Summary
With its running time of 142 minutes long, it consists of several 15-minute chapters, each detailing the making of one of his films – and two more showing his childhood and life.

Jan Harlan got many of Kubrick's collaborators for interviews, including Tom Cruise, Nicole Kidman, Keir Dullea, Arthur C. Clarke, Malcolm McDowell, Peter Ustinov, Jack Nicholson, György Ligeti and Matthew Modine. It also has interviews from film directors who were inspired by Kubrick such as Woody Allen, Steven Spielberg, Martin Scorsese and Sydney Pollack.

The film contains some rare footage, including from the Kubrick family home videos and on film sets, and clips from Fear and Desire - Kubrick's first feature-length film.

Release
It was released on DVD on October 23, 2007, and was featured on the tenth disc of Stanley Kubrick: The Essential Collection and Stanley Kubrick: Limited Edition Collection DVD and Blu-ray released May 31, 2011, respectively. The documentary was also bundled in a box set of some of Kubrick's other films released January 22, 2008.

Music
The soundtrack of the film is by composer and musician Jocelyn Pook, who had previously worked with Kubrick on Eyes Wide Shut (1999).

References

External links
 
 Stanley Kubrick: A Life in Pictures on Warner Brothers Entertainment's official YouTube channel
 Stanley Kubrick: A Life in Pictures on Rotten Tomatoes

2001 films
Documentary films about film directors and producers
Works about Stanley Kubrick
American documentary films
2001 documentary films
2000s English-language films
2000s American films